Taro Daniel was the defending champion but chose not to defend his title.

Yūichi Sugita won the title after defeating Kwon Soon-woo 6–4, 2–6, 7–6(7–2) in the final.

Seeds

Draw

Finals

Top half

Bottom half

References
Main Draw
Qualifying Draw

Keio Challenger - Men's Singles
Keio Challenger
2017 Keio Challenger